Cintré (Gallo: Ceintraé) is a commune in the Ille-et-Vilaine department of Brittany in northwestern France.

Geography
The river Meu forms all of the commune's western border.

Population
Inhabitants of Cintré are called Cintréens in French.

See also
Communes of the Ille-et-Vilaine department

References

External links

Official website 

Mayors of Ille-et-Vilaine Association 

Communes of Ille-et-Vilaine